The 133rd IOC Session was an IOC Session held in Buenos Aires, Argentina on 8 October 2018, during the 2018 Summer Youth Olympics. This was the second IOC Session held in Buenos Aires after the 125th IOC Session. The Candidature Phase for 2026 Winter Olympics was opened and the host of the 2022 Summer Youth Olympics for of its kind Olympics in Africa for the first time ever: Dakar, Senegal was announced at this IOC Session.

Before the session the Olympism in Action Forum was held in the city.

The session took place at the Buenos Aires Hilton in Buenos Aires.

Votes results

The Senegal President Macky Sall and Dakar Mayor Soham El Wardini were present at the session.

Election of the new IOC members
Nine new IOC members were elected at the session.

The nine new members are:
  Samira Asghari
  Daina Gudzinevičiūtė 
  Giovanni Malagò (as of January 1, 2019)
  Camilo Pérez López Moreira
  Felicite Rwemarika
  William Blick
  Prince Jigyel Ugyen Wangchuck
  Andrew Parsons
  Morinari Watanabe

References 

International Olympic Committee sessions
IOC
Events in Buenos Aires
October 2018 sports events in South America
2018 in Argentine sport
2010s in Buenos Aires
2018 conferences
2022 Summer Youth Olympics bids